Munby is a surname, and may refer to:

Alan Munby (1913–1974), British author
Arthur Munby (1828–1910), British poet and lawyer
Giles Munby (1813–1876), British botanist
James Munby (born 1948), British judge
Roger Munby (fl. 2000), Chairman of Norwich City FC
Sarah Munby (born 1981/1982), British civil servant